National Amusements, Inc. is an American privately owned movie theater operator and mass media holding company incorporated in Maryland and based in Norwood, Massachusetts. It is the controlling shareholder of Paramount Global.

History 

The company was founded by Michael Redstone in 1936 in the Boston suburb of Dedham as Northeast Theater Corporation, operating a chain of movie theaters in the region. In 1959, when the founder's son Sumner Redstone joined the company, it was renamed National Amusements. 

In 1986, the company acquired Viacom, a former CBS subsidiary syndicating television programs to stations around the United States. NA retained the Viacom name and made a string of large acquisitions in the early 1990s, announcing plans to merge with Paramount Communications (formerly Gulf+Western), parent of Paramount Pictures, in 1993, and buying the Blockbuster Video chain in 1994. The acquisition of Paramount Communications in July 1994 made Viacom one of the world's largest entertainment companies.

In March 2005, the company announced plans of looking into splitting Viacom into two publicly traded companies under the continuing ownership of National Amusements because of a stagnating stock price. The internal rivalry between Les Moonves and Tom Freston, longtime heads of CBS and MTV Networks respectively, and the controversy of Super Bowl XXXVIII halftime show, which resulted in MTV being banned from producing any more Super Bowl halftime shows, were also seen as factors. After the departure of Mel Karmazin in 2004, Redstone, who served as chairman and chief executive officer, decided to split the offices of president and chief operating officer between Moonves and Freston. Redstone was set to retire in the near future, and a split would be a creative solution to the matter of replacing him.

The split was approved by Viacom's board on June 14, 2005, and took effect on January 1, 2006, and effectively reversed the Viacom/CBS merger of 1999. The existing Viacom was renamed CBS Corporation (thus restoring its pre-merger name) and was headed by Moonves. It was intended to include Viacom's slower-growing business, namely CBS, The CW (a merger of UPN and The WB), CBS Radio (since sold to Entercom [renamed Audacy, Inc. in 2021] as of November 17, 2017), Simon & Schuster, CBS Outdoor (formerly Viacom Outdoor, since spun-off as Outfront Media in 2014), Showtime Networks, CBS Television Studios, CBS Television Distribution and CBS Studios International.

In addition, CBS Corporation was given Paramount Parks, which it later sold to amusement park operator Cedar Fair on June 30, 2006, and the CBS College Sports Network, now known as the CBS Sports Network.

Additionally, a spun-off company was created called Viacom, which was headed by Freston. It comprised MTV Networks, BET Networks, Paramount Pictures, and Paramount Pictures' home entertainment operations. These businesses were categorized as the high-growth businesses.

At the end of 2008, due to financial troubles, owners Sumner Redstone and Shari Redstone sold $400 million of nonvoting shares in National Amusements. In October 2009, the company sold almost $1 billion of its interest in the stock of CBS and Viacom and sold 35 theaters to Rave Motion Pictures. Today these theatres are owned by Cinemark, AMC, Alamo, or have closed. National Amusements now almost exclusively operates theaters in the Northeastern United States (with the exception of one location in Ohio). The following year, National Amusements planned to sell $390 million of notes to refinance a large part of the company's bank owed debt.

As of December 2019, National Amusements, directly and through subsidiaries, holds approximately 79.4% of the Class A (voting) common stock of Paramount Global, constituting 10.2% of the overall equity of the company. The company may hold an unspecified stake in Audacy, Inc., as part of the reverse Morris trust that spun CBS's radio assets off to that company; CBS Corporation shareholders overall held a 72% stake in the then-named Entercom as of the spin-off.

Current operations 

The company operates more than 1,500 movie screens across the Northeastern United States, the United Kingdom, and Latin America under its Showcase Cinemas, Showcase Cinema de Lux, Multiplex Cinemas, and Cinema de Lux. In Canada, National Amusements also owned Famous Players theatres through Viacom which today are now owned by Cineplex Entertainment and Landmark Cinemas. In 2004, National Amusements acquired the Brazilian operations to cinema chain UCI, and revamping it to be more in line with Showcase. They also share some of the corporate identities of Showcase and have XPlus & De Lux rooms in selected cinemas, as well as fully reclining seats. 

In 2019, it was announced that the multinational media conglomerates controlled by National Amusements (Viacom and CBS Corporation), would re-merge to form a new company named ViacomCBS. Viacom and CBS announced that the merger would close on December 4; following the official close, the company began trading on NASDAQ the following day. In 2022, the company was renamed Paramount Global.

Recent Chairman and CEO Sumner Redstone died on August 11, 2020.

References

Further reading

External links

 Showcase Cinemas website
 2001 Box Office Magazine profile of the company
 Yahoo! – National Amusements Inc. Company Profile

1936 establishments in Massachusetts
American companies established in 1936
Companies based in Dedham, Massachusetts
Companies based in Massachusetts
Entertainment companies established in 1936
Entertainment companies of the United States
Movie theatre chains in the United States
Paramount Global
Privately held companies based in Massachusetts

sah:National Amusements